Harmonica Solos is an album by musician George Winston of many different harmonica songs, both originals and covers, that was recorded from 1996 to 2005 and released in 2012.  Winston plays all the harmonica on the album.

Track listing

Studio Recordings: 1996-2005

Live in Bozeman, Montana 8-31-05

Personnel
George Winston – harmonica

References

External links
Liner Notes
 Harmonica Solos at Spotify

George Winston albums
2013 albums